Nenmanikkara is a census town in Thrissur district in the Indian state of Kerala. It lies nearer to NH544 near Amballur town. Nenmanikkara has vast area of landscape.

Demographics
 India census, Nenmanikkara had a population of 17,406. Males constitute 49% of the population and females 51%. Nenmanikkara has an average literacy rate of 83%, higher than the national average of 59.5%: male literacy is 85%, and female literacy is 80%. In Nenmanikkara, 11% of the population is under 6 years of age.

References

Cities and towns in Thrissur district